El Turista is a studio album by the singer-songwriter Josh Rouse. The album was released by Rouse in 2010 via his Bedroom Classics label.

Track listing
	Bienvenido – 2:18
	Duerme – 4:11
	Lemon Tree – 3:05
	Sweet Elaine – 4:28
	Mesie Julian – 2:37
	I Will Live on Islands – 3:03
	Valencia – 4:37
	Cotton Eye Joe – 3:58
	Las Voces – 3:53
	Don't Act Tough – 4:23

Digital bonus tracks
	To the Clock, To the City – 3:53
	Oh, Look What the Sun Did! – 2:40
	Lazy Days With Josephine – 2:09

References

Josh Rouse albums
2010 albums